When Love Is Young is a 1937 American comedy film directed by Hal Mohr and starring Virginia Bruce, Kent Taylor, Walter Brennan, Greta Meyer, Christian Rub and William Tannen. Written by Joseph Fields and Eve Greene, it is based on the 1935 short story Class Prophecy by Eleanore Griffin that was originally serialized in McCall's Magazine. The film was released on March 28, 1937 by Universal Pictures.

Plot
Wanda Werner is aspiring opera singer from rural America and tries to make it big by singing popular hits from Broadway.

Cast       
Virginia Bruce as Wanda Werner
Kent Taylor as Andy Russell
Walter Brennan as Uncle Hugo
Greta Meyer as Hannah Werner
Christian Rub as Anton Werner
William Tannen as Norman Crocker
Jean Rogers as Irene Henry
Sterling Holloway as Orville Kane
Nydia Westman as 'Dotty' Leonard
David Oliver as Cudgy Wallace
Laurie Douglas as Laurie Sykes
J. Scott Smart as Winthrop Grove
Franklin Pangborn as John Dorman

References

External links
 

1937 films
American comedy films
1937 comedy films
Universal Pictures films
Films based on short fiction
American black-and-white films
1930s English-language films
1930s American films